Janio Bikel Figueiredo da Silva (born 28 June 1995), known as Janio Bikel, is a Bissau-Guinean professional footballer who plays as a midfielder for Russian club FC Khimki. He formerly played for SC Heerenveen, NEC, CSKA Sofia and Vancouver Whitecaps FC. A former youth international for Portugal, he plays for the Guinea-Bissau national team.

Career
On 7 March 2015, Janio Bikel made his professional debut with SC Heerenveen in a 2014–15 Eredivisie match against ADO Den Haag.

On 14 June 2018, Janio Bikel signed with Bulgarian club CSKA Sofia.

Janio Bikel moved to Canadian Major League Soccer side Vancouver Whitecaps FC on 28 February 2020. He scored his first goal on 23 June 2021, in a 2–1 loss to the LA Galaxy

On 21 January 2022, Janio Bikel joined Italian club Vicenza on loan. 

Bikel didn't appear for Vancouver during their 2022 season, but was officially released by the club at the end of the season.

On 11 February 2023, Bikel signed with Russian Premier League club FC Khimki.

International career
Born in Guinea-Bissau and raised in Portugal, Bikel is a former youth international for Portugal. He debuted with the Guinea-Bissau national team in a friendly 3–0 win over Equatorial Guinea on 23 March 2022.

References

External links

1995 births
Sportspeople from Bissau
Portuguese sportspeople of Bissau-Guinean descent
Bissau-Guinean emigrants to Portugal
Naturalised citizens of Portugal
Living people
Bissau-Guinean footballers
Guinea-Bissau international footballers
Portuguese footballers
Portugal youth international footballers
Association football midfielders
SC Heerenveen players
NEC Nijmegen players
PFC CSKA Sofia players
Vancouver Whitecaps FC players
L.R. Vicenza players
FC Khimki players
Eredivisie players
Eerste Divisie players
First Professional Football League (Bulgaria) players
Major League Soccer players
Serie B players
Russian Premier League players
Portuguese expatriate footballers
Bissau-Guinean expatriate footballers
Expatriate footballers in Spain
Bissau-Guinean expatriate sportspeople in Spain
Portuguese expatriate sportspeople in Spain
Expatriate footballers in the Netherlands
Bissau-Guinean expatriate sportspeople in the Netherlands
Portuguese expatriate sportspeople in the Netherlands
Expatriate footballers in Bulgaria
Bissau-Guinean expatriate sportspeople in Bulgaria
Portuguese expatriate sportspeople in Bulgaria
Expatriate soccer players in Canada
Bissau-Guinean expatriate sportspeople in Canada
Portuguese expatriate sportspeople in Canada
Expatriate footballers in Italy
Bissau-Guinean expatriate sportspeople in Italy
Portuguese expatriate sportspeople in Italy
Expatriate footballers in Russia
Bissau-Guinean expatriate sportspeople in Russia
Portuguese expatriate sportspeople in Russia